Genesis is the seventh full-length album by the Greek extreme metal band Rotting Christ.

The release showed some return to the group's more aggressive early days as a black metal band, featuring fast, percussive tempos and raw vocals, as well as some gothic and doom elements from middle releases.

It was produced by Andy Classen in Germany at the Stage-One-Studio, also used by Krisiun, Belphegor and Callenish Circle.

Track listing
All songs written by Sakis Tolis. 
 "Daemons" – 3:27
 "Lex Talionis" – 5:03
 "Quintessence" – 4:45
 "Nightmare" – 7:08
 "In Domine Sathana" – 5:16
 "Release Me" – 3:51
 "The Call of the Aethyrs" – 4:32
 "Dying" – 4:48
 "Ad Noctis" – 6:11
 "Under the Name of the Legion" – 6:29
 "Astral Enbodyment [Brazil Edition]"  – 5:51

Popular culture
The track "Ad Noctis" was featured on the soundtrack of the metal-themed video game Brütal Legend.

Credits
Sakis Tolis – guitar, vocals
Kostas Vassilakopoulos – guitar
Andreas Lagios – bass
Georgios Tolias – keyboards
Themis Tolis – drums

References

2002 albums
Rotting Christ albums
Albums produced by Andy Classen